Javier Gil Valle, also known as Javivi, (born June 20, 1961 in Hervás, Province of Cáceres), is a Spanish actor.

When he was a child, he lived in France and he went later to Madrid, where he studied secondary education and sociology. He worked as a social worker in Madrid Council and he later went back to Paris where he received a Ph.D degree in Sorbonne. In 1994, he went back to Spain, and he started a career as an actor with Inocente, Inocente. His name Javivi is because of his stuttering.

Filmography
The Monk (2011)
Locos por el sexo (2006)
Ninette  (2005)
Tiovivo c. 1950 (2004)
Diario de una becaria (2003)
Haz conmigo lo que quieras (2003)
El robo más grande jamás contado (2002)
Noche de reyes (2001)
Operación gónada (2000)
La mujer más fea del mundo (1999)
Los lobos de Washington (1999)
Se buscan fulmontis (1999)
Mátame mucho (1998)
El grito en el cielo (1998)
Pápa Piquillo (1998)
Brácula. Condemor II (1997)
Igual caen dos (El atardecer del Pezuñas) (1997)
Los porretas (1996)

References

External links

Official website 

1961 births
Living people
People from the Province of Cáceres
University of Paris alumni
Spanish male television actors
Spanish male film actors